Christian Dobnik (born 10 July 1986) is an Austrian footballer who plays for Wolfsberger AC II.

References

External links

1986 births
Living people
Austrian footballers
Association football goalkeepers
FC Kärnten players
FC Lustenau players
Wolfsberger AC players
Austrian Football Bundesliga players
2. Liga (Austria) players